Angel Yassenov (born 20 April 1965) is a Bulgarian wrestler. He competed in the men's freestyle 68 kg at the 1988 Summer Olympics.

References

External links
 

1965 births
Living people
Bulgarian male sport wrestlers
Olympic wrestlers of Bulgaria
Wrestlers at the 1988 Summer Olympics
People from Targovishte Province